Yuba City Astronomical Observatory  is an astronomical observatory owned by the Doscher Family Trust and operated primarily by trustee Richard J. Doscher of Yuba City, California.  It is located South of Yuba City, which is adjacent to the Sutter Buttes Mountain Range.

The observatory has one 9 foot dome and permanent pier housing an 11-inch Schmidt-Cassegrain telescope. It was established on September 22, 2010. Primary work consists of planetary, deep sky, NEO studies, astrometry, photometry and astrophotography. IAU/MPC assignment number pending.

See also 
List of astronomical observatories

References

External links
 Yuba City Astronomical Observatory
 Yuba City Astronomical Observatory Clear Sky Clock Forecasts of observing conditions.
 U.S. Naval Observatory Astronomical Applications Department - Sun and Moon Data for Yuba City Astronomical Observatory

Astronomical observatories in California
Buildings and structures in Sutter County, California
Yuba City, California